Ami Trivedi (born 15 July 1982) is an Indian television and theatre artist. She is most known for her roles of "Kittu" in Kituu Sab Janti Hai (2005–06) and "Kokila" in popular comedy sitcom Papad Pol (2010–11). she is currently portraying Manjari Harshvardhan Birla in Yeh Rishta Kya Kehlata Hai. 

Trivedi has done Gujarati theatre for many years and has appeared in number of Hindi serials also. Her father is a well-known theatre actor, Tushar Trivedi who has been involved in Gujarati plays for over 20 years. Her younger brother, Karan Trivedi, is also a theatre actor and voice-over artist.

Early life

Career

Acting
Trivedi started acting at a very young age. As a child artist, she has acted in Hindi serials like Hamrahi and Zee Horror Show in small cameo roles. In 1994, she acted in Prakash Jha's telefilm Didi which focused on the education of female children in rural areas. After taking a gap for studies in class 10th and 12th, Trivedi returned to acting as a teenager and did Gujarati theatre for few years. She has also received appreciation for her acting skills from the Gujarati audiences.

Her major theatre background helped her in getting many acting offers from television channels. She got her first break for a small role in a daily soap Babul Ki Duwayen Leti Jaa which aired on Zee TV. Thereafter, she did cameos & supporting roles in few shows like Dil Chaahta Hai and Kumkum  Ek Pyara Sa Bandhan. She also acted in the popular comedy sitcom Khichdi, the first show produced by Hats Off Productions. Despite the popularity of the show, Trivedi would not appear in its second season Instant Khichdi because she would be committed to other projects.

Later in 2005, Trivedi auditioned for Kituu Sab Janti Hai on the insistence of a coordinator. She didn't even have her photographs taken for self-promotion but she impressed them and managed to get a call back in two days. She won the lead role of Kittu in the show. She was chosen among 40–45 women based on her talent. It was the breakthrough point of her career. She played the role of a young extrovert 20-something young woman Kituu who takes the plunge to face the professional world. The show ran for two years and ended in March 2007.

After that, she worked in various other Hindi serials like Zaara- Pyaar Ki Saugat, Jaane Kya Baat Hui and Bajega Band Baaja.

In 2010, Trivedi acted in SAB TV's comedy sitcom Papad Pol opposite Swapnil Joshi. She became popular for her role of Kokila in the show for which she was nominated at the Indian Telly Awards in the category for Best Actress in a Comic Role. Papad Pol ended on 13, September 2011.

Trivedi also portrayed the role of Tulika in SAB TV's comedy serial Sajan Re Jhoot Mat Bolo. The show ended on 6 January 2012 after successfully running for 2 years. Trivedi also appeared as a guest in famous dance class show Nachle Ve with Saroj Khan hosted by Saroj Khan, on 21 December 2011.

Since 2012, Trivedi kept a distance from television, spending time with her family, until she made a comeback in July 2013 with Zee TV's horror show Fear Files: Darr Ki Sacchi Tasvirein. She did an episodic role in the show. She later entered in Sony TV's popular court room drama Adaalat where she played the role of a public prosecutor.
She acted as mother in Tedi Medi Family a wonderful TV series on Big Magic channel.
she also worked with SAB TV as Rupal (Chakudi) in their TV show Saat Phero Ki Hera Pherie.

Dubbing
In 2001, Trivedi gave her voice to Daniel Radcliffe's role as "Harry Potter" in the Hindi-dubbed version of the first film of the Harry Potter Series. Since the second film of the series, her brother, Karan Trivedi took over as the second Hindi dubbing voice for Harry Potter, until it was passed to Rajesh Kava after the fifth film. Since then, she has lent voices in various animated and live-action films like The Incredibles and Barbie Mariposa. She has dubbed for some Gujarati films also.

She's also said that to be the official current Hindi voice for Disney character, Hiro Hamada.

Personal life
Trivedi's father, Tushaar Trivedi is now directing plays as a drama director at the Bhartiya Vidya Bhavan in London. Her mother, Jaya Trivedi is a housewife, and the greatest inspiration in her life. Her mother commutes between Mumbai and London. Whenever she's in Mumbai, she frequently visits her daughter on the sets with homemade food and also helps her to select the right kind of work. Trivedi's brother, Karan Trivedi is also a theatre artist.

Trivedi married her boyfriend, Niraj Sanghai in 2009. Niraj Sanghai works at Prime Focus Ltd, a post production services company. They met through a common friend on the sets of Kituu Sab Janti Hai. They belong to different castes, but finally after four years of dating, they were married on 10 December 2009. At present, they live in a sought-after area of Mumbai, Lokhandwala, Andheri (W). The couple have a son, born on 15 December 2012.

Gujarati plays
Ami has worked in many Gujarati plays. Some of her famous commercial Gujarati plays are listed below.

Filmography

Television

Dubbing roles

Live action films

Animated films

Awards
Winner, New Promising Actress Award by Indo-American Society for Kituu Sab Janti Hai in December 2005.
Winner, Gujarati Actress Award in 2008.
Nominated, at Indian Telly Awards in the category Best Actor in a Comic Role (Female) in 2010 for Papad Pol.
 Winner, Kala Ratna Award for achieving excellence in her field at Hira Manik Awards Ceremony in 2011.

See also
Karan Trivedi – Ami's Younger Brother who is also an actor.
List of people from Gujarat
List of Indian dubbing artists

References

External links
 

Actresses from Mumbai
Indian voice actresses
Living people
Indian television actresses
Actresses in Hindi television
Indian stage actresses
20th-century Indian actresses
21st-century Indian actresses
1982 births